Pharos University in Alexandria (PUA)  جامعة فاروس بالإسكندرية is a non-governmental and profit making university in Alexandria, Egypt.

It obtained the license from the Egyptian Supreme Council of Private Universities to begin operation in the 2006–2007 academic year. It includes eleven faculties: Pharmacy and Drug Manufacturing, Dentistry, Engineering, Languages and Translation, Financial and Administrative Sciences, Legal Studies and International Relations, Tourism and Hotel Management, Allied Medical Sciences, Mass Communication, Physical Therapy, Arts and Design.

Faculty of Engineering 
The faculty consists of the following departments:
Construction Engineering & Management Department.
Architectural Engineering Department.
Computer Engineering Department.
Electrical Engineering Department:
Electrical Power Engineering & Control Section.
Electronics & Communications Engineering Section.
Mechanical Engineering Department:
Mechanical Power Engineering Section.
Industrial & Manufacturing Engineering Section.
Petrochemical Engineering Department.

External links
Pharos University in Alexandria (English language site)

Universities in Egypt
Educational institutions established in 2006
2006 establishments in Egypt